Compass Cope was a program initiated by the United States Air Force to develop an upgraded reconnaissance Unmanned aerial vehicle. The two aircraft that participated in the program were:

 Boeing YQM-94 B-Gull – Compass Cope B
 Ryan YQM-98 R-Tern – Compass Cope R